is a Japanese actor from Hiroshima Prefecture. Miura made his acting debut in 2005. His first major role has been as Gou Fukami/Geki Violet in Juken Sentai Gekiranger. He announced on March 10, 2018 that he will retire from the entertainment business on March 31, 2018.

Filmography

Television
Juken Sentai Gekiranger as Gou Fukami/Geki Violet (2007)
Here Is Greenwood as Mitsuru Ikeda (2008)
Saba Doru as Takeo Tabata (2012)
Mō Ichido Kimi ni, Propose as Riki Mita (2012)
Tsuribaka Nisshi: Shin'nyū Shain Hamasaki Densuke as Satoshi Iwami (2015)

Films
Juken Sentai Gekiranger vs Boukenger as Gou Fukami/Geki Violet (2007)
Engine Sentai Go-onger vs. Gekiranger as Gou Fukami/Geki Violet (2008)
Battle of Demons as Kuniichi Mitsugi (2009)
Yellow Kid as Hashimoto (2010)
Natural Woman (2010)
Futari Ecchi as Makoto Onoda (2011)
Space Sheriff Gavan: The Movie as Kai Hyuga/Space Sheriff Sharivan (2012)
Kamen Rider × Super Sentai × Space Sheriff: Super Hero Taisen Z as Kai Hyuga/Space Sheriff Sharivan (2013)
Ryusei as Kazuki (2013)
Crows Explode (2014)
Space Sheriffs: Next Generation as Kai Hyuga/Space Sheriff Sharivan (2014)

References

Official profile 
Official blog 

1983 births
People from Hiroshima Prefecture
Japanese male actors
Living people
Stardust Promotion artists